Neil Rossouw (born 25 September 1976) is a Namibian cricketer. He is a right-handed batsman and a right-arm medium-pace bowler who played First-class cricket in 2004, as well as playing for the Namibian team when Pakistan and New Zealand's A teams toured the country. However, he played his first match, for an Eastern Province XI nearly ten years previously, when Durham toured South Africa.

He also played in the Faithwear Inter-Provincial Competition of 2004.

External links
Neil Rossouw at Cricket Archive 

1976 births
People from Keetmanshoop
Namibian cricketers
Living people